Rudheath is a village and civil parish in the unitary authority of Cheshire West and Chester and the ceremonial county of Cheshire, in the north west of England, approximately 2 miles east of Northwich. The population of the civil parish as taken at the 2011 census was 3,807.

Rudheath is the location of Rudheath Primary Academy, and the Rudheath Senior Academy. Both schools provide education to school-age children from the village and the surrounding area.

Contemporary major local employers include Frank Roberts & Sons, a bakery that has been associated with the area since 1887.  Two of Frank Roberts & Sons's three main business divisions, Roberts Bakery and The Little Treats Co, are based on the A556 in Rudheath and Aldred's The Bakers, is located in Ilkeston, Derbyshire.  Morrisons supermarket has a large distribution centre on the A530, while Orange, Barclays Bank and The Hut Group all have business centres at Gadbrook Park, off the A556.

See also

Listed buildings in Rudheath

References

External links

Villages in Cheshire
Civil parishes in Cheshire